Robert Haywood may refer to:

 Robert Haywood (cricketer, born 1887) (1887–1942), English cricketer
 Robert Haywood (cricketer, born 1858) (1858–1922), English cricketer

See also
Robert Heywood, English cricketer, born 1994
Robert Hayward (disambiguation)